The 1981–82 Tennessee Volunteers basketball team represented the University of Tennessee as a member of the Southeastern Conference during the 1981–82 college basketball season. Led by fourth-year head coach Don DeVoe, the team played their home games at the Stokely Athletic Center in Knoxville, Tennessee. The Volunteers finished with a record of 20–10 (13–5 SEC, T-1st) and received an at-large bid to the 1982 NCAA tournament as the 9 seed in the Mideast region.

This was the fourth of five straight seasons of NCAA Tournament basketball for the Tennessee men's program. Junior Dale Ellis was named the SEC Player of the Year  an award he would take home the next season as well.

Roster

Schedule and results

|-
!colspan=9 style=| Regular season

|-
!colspan=9 style=| SEC tournament

|-
!colspan=9 style=| NCAA tournament

Rankings

References

Tennessee Volunteers basketball seasons
Tennessee
Tennessee
Volunteers
Volunteers